Dwi Sasono (born in Surabaya, East Java, Indonesia on March 30, 1980) is an Indonesian actor of Javanese descent. He is the husband of Indonesian actress and singer, Widi Mulia.

Career
Sasono's acting career, and his nickname, began with the role of Rizal in the film Mendadak Dangdut (2006) directed by Rudi Soedjarwo.

After Mendadak Dangdut, Sasono appeared in Pocong 2 (2006), Mengejar Mas Mas (2007), and Otomatis Romantis (2008).

At the 2007 MTV Indonesia Movie Awards, Sasono received three nominations: Most Favorite Actor (Mengejar Mas Mas), Most Favorite Supporting Actor (Pocong 2), and Breakthrough Actor/Actress (Mengejar Mas-Mas).

2020 Marijuana Arrest
Sasono was arrested on 26 May 2020 at his residence in Pondok Labu, South Jakarta, after allegedly purchasing marijuana from a drug dealer. Police searched Sasono's house and found 16 grams of marijuana in a cabinet. Police said he tested positive to marijuana. Sasono on 1 June said he was a "victim" because he was only an addicted user and not a dealer.

Sasono told police he used marijuana to fill in time and overcome insomnia while self-isolating at his home during the COVID-19 pandemic. His legal team requested he be allowed to undergo rehabilitation, rather than be put on trial for illegal drug possession and consumption.

Filmography

Sitcom

Awards and nominations

References

External links 
 

1980 births
Indonesian male film actors
Living people
21st-century Indonesian male actors